Pedacovirus is a subgenus of viruses in the genus Alphacoronavirus.

References

Virus subgenera
Alphacoronaviruses